Nicholas Dawson may refer to:

Nicholas Mosby Dawson, leader in the Dawson Massacre
Sir Nicholas Dawson, 5th Baronet (born 1957), of the Dawson baronets